Tangen is a surname. Notable people with the surname include: 

 Christopher von Tangen (1877-1941), Norwegian fencer
 Ed Tangen (1873-1951), American photographer
 Eivind Tangen (born 1993), Norwegian handball player
 Knut Tangen (1928-2007), Norwegian speed skater
 Nicolai Tangen (born 1966), Norwegian hedge fund manager
 Otto Tangen (1886-1956), Norwegian Nordic skier
 Ragne Tangen (1927-2015), Norwegian children's television presenter